GOLD may refer to:

 Gold (disambiguation)

Science and technology
 Gold, a chemical element
 Genomes OnLine Database
 Global-scale Observations of the Limb and Disk, a NASA Explorer Mission of Opportunity
 GOLD (parser), an open-source parser-generator of BNF-based grammars
 Graduates of the Last Decade, an Institute of Electrical and Electronics Engineers program to garner more university level student members
 Global Initiative for Chronic Obstructive Lung Disease, guidelines for aiding chronic obstructive lung disease from the National Heart, Lung, and Blood Institute and the World Health Organization
 Gathered or linked data, in the staging tables of a data warehouse

Other uses
 GOLD (ontology), an ontology for descriptive linguistics
Gold (British TV channel), television channel stylised as "GOLD"

See also
 Gold (disambiguation)